Mads Torry (born 13 May 1986) is a former professional Danish football player, who retired in the summer of 2013 while playing for Vanløse IF. In July 2013 he was confirmed as new sports director at the same club.

References

External links
Danish national team profile

Living people
1986 births
Danish men's footballers
Vejle Boldklub players
Vanløse IF players
Association football forwards